Caayguara is a genus of Brazilian huntsman spiders that was first described by C. A. Rheims in 2010.

Species
 it contains twelve species, found in Brazil:
Caayguara ajuba Rheims, 2010 – Brazil
Caayguara album (Mello-Leitão, 1918) (type) – Brazil
Caayguara apiaba Rheims, 2010 – Brazil
Caayguara atyaia Rheims, 2010 – Brazil
Caayguara catuoca Rheims, 2010 – Brazil
Caayguara cupepemassu Rheims, 2010 – Brazil
Caayguara cupepemayri Rheims, 2010 – Brazil
Caayguara itajucamussi Rheims, 2010 – Brazil
Caayguara juati Rheims, 2010 – Brazil
Caayguara pinda Rheims, 2010 – Brazil
Caayguara poi Rheims, 2010 – Brazil
Caayguara ybityriguara Rheims, 2010 – Brazil

See also
 List of Sparassidae species

References

Araneomorphae genera
Sparassidae
Spiders of Brazil